Pablo Israel Reyes (born September 5, 1993) is a Dominican professional baseball infielder and outfielder in the Oakland Athletics organization. He previously played in Major League Baseball (MLB) for the Pittsburgh Pirates and Milwaukee Brewers.

Career

Pittsburgh Pirates
Reyes signed with the Pittsburgh Pirates as an international free agent on May 31, 2012. He spent the 2012 season with the DSL Pirates, hitting .284/.368/.399/.767 with 1 home run and 23 RBI. He repeated with the DSL Pirates in 2013, hitting .304/.376/.429/.806 with 3 home runs and 28 RBI. He spent the 2014 season with the Bristol Pirates, hitting .272/.367/.367/.733 with 2 home runs and 16 RBI. Reyes spent the 2015 season with the West Virginia Power, hitting .268/.345/.438/.783 with 12 home runs and 60 RBI. He spent the 2016 season with the Bradenton Marauders, hitting .265/.341/.386/.727 with 5 home runs and 45 RBI. Reyes hit .274/.356/.410/.765 with 10 home runs and 50 RBI for the Altoona Curve in 2017. Reyers split the 2018 minor league season between Altoona and the Indianapolis Indians, hitting a combined .284/.337/.421/.759 with 8 home runs and 41 RBI.

On September 1, 2018, the Pirates selected Reyes' contract and called him up to the majors leagues for the first time. In 13 games with the Pirates, he hit .293/.349/.483/.832 with 3 home runs and 7 RBI.

Reyes made the Pirates Opening Day roster in 2019, and hit .203/.274/.322/.596 with 2 home runs and 17 RBI over 71 games. Reyes was designated for assignment on January 9, 2020, following the signing of Guillermo Heredia. He was suspended by MLB for the first 80 games of the 2020 season due to the use of a Performance Enhancing Drug (PED). He became a free agent on November 2, 2020.

Milwaukee Brewers
On January 7, 2021, Reyes signed a minor league contract with the Milwaukee Brewers organization. On April 26, 2021, Reyes was selected to the active roster. After only playing 58 games for the Brewers, Reyes became a free agent after the 2022 season.

Oakland Athletics 
On November 19, 2022, Reyes signed a minor league contract with the Oakland Athletics organization.

References

External links

1993 births
Living people
Sportspeople from Santo Domingo
Dominican Republic expatriate baseball players in the United States
Major League Baseball players from the Dominican Republic
Major League Baseball infielders
Major League Baseball outfielders
Pittsburgh Pirates players
Milwaukee Brewers players
Dominican Summer League Pirates players
Bristol Pirates players
West Virginia Black Bears players
West Virginia Power players
Bradenton Marauders players
Leones del Escogido players
Altoona Curve players
Indianapolis Indians players
Tigres del Licey players
Nashville Sounds players